Aerie Pharmaceuticals Inc. is a clinical-stage pharmaceutical company focused on the discovery, development and commercialization of therapies for the treatment of patients with glaucoma and other diseases of the eye. Aerie's two lead product candidates are once-daily therapies for lowering intraocular pressure with mechanisms to treat patients with glaucoma or ocular hypertension.

In August 2022, Swiss eye-care firm Alcon agreed to buy Aerie Pharmaceuticals for US$770million. The acquisition completed in November 2022.

References

External links
 

Companies based in Durham, North Carolina
Companies listed on the Nasdaq
Pharmaceutical companies of the United States
2022 mergers and acquisitions